Youngtown Memorial Oval is a football ground at Youngtown in the southern suburbs of Launceston, Tasmania, Australia and is home of the South Launceston Football Club in the NTFA.

History 
Youngtown Memorial Oval was opened in 1972 after NTFA club, City-South Football Club, moved to the new venue and established it as their home base after leaving York Park following the 1971 season. 
It remained their home base until they merged with East Launceston Football Club on 26 May 1986 to become South Launceston, from which, the newly merged club continued to base itself at the venue.

Youngtown Memorial Oval has one small main stand (Reg Walker Stand) which was transported across from the former York Park BMX track in the early 1990s and was later sealed, roofed and had changerooms built beneath, the rest of the ground has parking spaces available to cars.
It has a capacity of approximately 3,500 and regularly hosts finals for the current NTFA (formerly the Tasmanian Amateur Football League Northern Division) competition.
Youngtown was much maligned during the former TFL Statewide League years as South Launceston were, on several occasions moved away from the ground by the TFL to play at York Park in an effort to attract bigger crowds and play at a better facility.
South Launceston joined the Tasmanian State League in 2009 and played the majority of home fixtures at Youngtown, however, in 2011 and at the end of 2013 the Club conducted games at York Park. 
Despite winning the TSL premiership in 2013, South Launceston returned to community football in the NTFA in 2014 season, playing its home games at Youngtown. 
The largest attendance drawn at Youngtown during its tenure as a TFL Statewide League venue was 1,902 for an all-Launceston derby match between South Launceston and North Launceston on 12 June 1994.

References

Sports venues in Tasmania
Buildings and structures in Launceston, Tasmania